Robert L. Levy is a film producer with notable box office hits such as Wedding Crashers, Serendipity, Pay It Forward, Van Wilder, The Wedding Planner. His production company is Tapestry Films, which in 2002 had a first look deal with Miramax.

Filmography
He was a producer in all films unless otherwise noted.

Film

As writer

Second unit director or assistant director

Miscellaneous crew

As director

Camera and electrical department

Production manager

Thanks

Television

As writer

Thanks

References

External links
 

Living people
American film producers
Year of birth missing (living people)